For information on all Lamar University sports, see Lamar Cardinals and Lady Cardinals

The 2014–15 Lamar Cardinals basketball team represented Lamar University during the 2014–15 NCAA Division I men's basketball season. The Cardinals, led by first year head coach Tic Price, played their home games at the Montagne Center and were members of the Southland Conference.

After former head coach, Pat Knight, was fired on February 16, 2014, the Cardinals finished the season with a record of 1–4 under interim head coach, Tic Price.  Price was named head coach on March 18, 2014.  The 2014–2015 was coach Price's first season as the Cardinals' head coach.

The Cardinals were picked to finish tenth (10th) in the conference in both the Coaches' Poll and the Sports Information Director polls.

The Cardinals finished the season 15–15, 9–9 in Southland play to finish in sixth place. Due to APR penalties, they were not eligible for postseason play, including the Southland tournament.  Compared to total wins (all Division I) for the previous two seasons of three and four respectively, the fifteen wins (eleven wins over NCAA Division I competition) represented a marked improvement.

Two Cardinals were recognized by the Southland Conference at the conclusion of the regular season.  Tyran de Lattibeaudiere received several Southland Conference honors.  He was named Southland Conference Newcomer of the Year.  In addition, he was named to both the conference All-Defense team and the All-Southland Conference, 2nd team.  Anthony Holiday was named to the All-Southland Conference, 3rd team.

Media
All Lamar Cardinals home games except those otherwise contracted for will be broadcast online live by Big Red Sports Network (BRSN).

Off season
On April 16, Tic Price named his coaching staff.  Anthony Anderson, Robert Kummer, and Antonio Madlock were named assistant coaches.  On May 16, Coach Madlock resigned to take a similar position at Mississippi.  Price completed his staff on June 27 naming Matt Pace as Director of Basketball Operations.  Brian Burton was named assistant coach filling the vacancy left by Antonio Madlock's departure in May.

In May, Lamar was informed that the men's basketball team would not be eligible for postseason play for failure to achieve NCAA APR standards.  The team also has reduced practice from six days per week down to five per week and will be allowed only 16 hours of practice time a week instead of the normal 20 hours per week.  The Lamar men's basketball program was one of nine programs that did not meet the APR standards.

Departures

Class of 2014 signees

Roster
ֶ

Schedule and Results

Season Results:  

|-
!colspan=12 style="" | Out of Conference

|-
!colspan=12 style="" | Conference Games

See also
2014–15 Lamar Lady Cardinals basketball team

References

Lamar Cardinals basketball seasons
Lamar
Lamar Cardinals basketball
Lamar Cardinals basketball